Blonds (often stylized as BLONDS) were an American indie pop duo formed in 2011 in Treasure Coast, Florida, consisting of Jordan Asher Cruz and Cari Rae.

Blonds released their debut album, The Bad Ones on August 7, 2012.

Biography
Blonds first came to prominence when they released their Dark Roots EP in December 2011. The EP gained quite a few favorable reviews and earned Blonds the title of band to watch from Stereogum.

After the group broke up in 2013, Jordan would go on to be signed to Roc Nation under the pseudonym Boots.

Discography

Studio albums
The Bad Ones (August 7, 2012)

Extended plays
Dark Roots EP (December 13, 2011)

References

Indie pop groups from New York (state)
Indie pop groups from Florida
American musical duos
Musical groups established in 2011
Musical groups disestablished in 2013
2011 establishments in Florida